Q-Tips were a blue-eyed soul and new wave rock band from Britain, first formed in 1979 from the remnants of the rock group Streetband.

Streetband
Apart from the novelty song "Toast", a B-side made successful from heavy airplay by Capital Radio’s Kenny Everett, Streetband had failed to find any commercial success with their two albums London and Dilemma (both released in 1979). Drummer Chalky and guitarist Roger Kelly departed, leaving the remaining trio of Paul Young on vocals, Mick Pearl on bass guitar, and guitarist John Gifford.

Career
The ex-Streetbanders added Dave Lathwell on guitar and Baz Watts on drums. In addition, a four-piece brass section was created by Steve Farr (baritone saxophone), Richard Blanchchard (tenor saxophone), Oscar Stuart Blandamer (alto saxophone) and Tony Hughes (trumpet), and all hailed from the North London and Hertfordshire area. Organist Ian Kewley lived in Essex. Q-Tips' name derived from a well-known brand of cotton swab. 

Q-Tips' first rehearsals took place in November 1979. Their first concert was on 18 November 1979 at the Queens Arms Hotel in Harrow. This was followed by another at the Horn of Plenty in St Albans – a regular gig for Streetband during 1978 – and a total of 16 in their first month of existence. Some personnel changes occurred during the first six months, with Blanchard and Lathwell leaving the band.

By 1 April 1980, the band had recorded two tracks, "SYSLJFM (The Letter Song)", and "Having a Party", both recorded at the Livingstone Studios in Barnet. Constant touring and concert appearances had built a strong fan base by mid 1981, when the small amount of soul music covers were outnumbered by the band's own tracks. The professionalism of the band had attracted the attention of several record labels, with Mickie Most (RAK Records) confirming on BBC Radio 1's Round Table programme that Q-Tips "...are easily the best live band working at the moment". In August 1980, the British music magazine NME reported that Q-Tips had released their debut, self-titled album.

In time, John Gifford was replaced by Garth Watt-Roy (formerly of The Greatest Show on Earth, East of Eden and Marmalade, and brother of Blockheads bassist Norman Watt-Roy) on guitar, and Blandamer was replaced by Nick Payne. This line-up remained for the rest of the band's career. They appeared on BBC Television's In Concert, Rock Goes to College and The Old Grey Whistle Test in the latter part of 1981.  Other television appearance included Saturday morning TV. Q-Tips opened for The J. Geils Band, The Knack, Thin Lizzy, Bob Marley and the Average White Band.

The band toured with After the Fire, and supported The Who on their 12-date UK tour in 1981. In 1981, Q-Tips played the Montreux Jazz Festival. With poor record sales after the release of two albums and seven singles, the Q-Tips broke up in early 1982 when Paul Young signed a solo recording contract with CBS Records, retaining Kewley as keyboardist and co-writer. In late 1982 and early 1983, Farr, Hughes, Blandamer and Watts toured with Adam Ant on the UK and US legs of his Friend or Foe tour, and Farr, Hughes and Watts remained for Ant's 1984 Strip tour.

Young briefly teamed up again with Q-Tips for a reunion tour in 1993.

Discography

Streetband

Albums

Singles

Q-Tips

Albums

Singles

References

English rock music groups
British soul musical groups
English new wave musical groups
Musical groups established in 1979
Musical groups disestablished in 1982